Mullah Mohammad Jafar Sabzevari (died October 20, 1722) was one of the Iranian scholars and clerics of the 12th century AH, the Imam of Friday Prayer of the Shah Mosque in Isfahan and the author of several books and treatises including "Nowruznameh" and "Ma'ad" which was compiled at the request of Shah Sultan Hussein Safavid.

Life and lineage
Mullah Mohammad Jafar Sabzevari was born in Isfahan and is the eldest son of Mohammad Bagher Sabzevari (known as Mohaghegh Sabzevari) (1608-1679) and his lineage is as follows: Mohammad Jafar ibn Akhund Mullah Mohammad Bagher ibn Mohammad Moemen al-Sharif al-Sabzevari. He was an educated person in Islamic sciences. He was one of the students of his father, Mohaghegh Sabzevari, Mohaghegh Khansari and Mohammad-Baqer Majlesi and has taught Islamic sciences in Isfahan for many years.

His wife was Kheir ol-Nesa Khanom bint Agha Alinaghi: She died on the first of October 23, 1730 and is buried next to her husband's grave in the southern part of Hakim Mosque, Isfahan. His eldest son Mirza Mohammad Rahim was the Shaykh al-Islām (kind of religious leader) of Isfahan from 1738 to 1767. He died on 9 May 1768. His other son Mullah Mohammad Zaki was a genius and researcher who studied religious sciences in Isfahan, but died at a young age (1698), and his tombstone is installed on the wall in the north eastern room of Agha Hossein Khansari Mausoleum in Takht-e Foulad. Mullah Mohammad Jafar Sabzevari also had a daughter Roqayyeh Sharif who was a charitable woman. She dedicated several properties located in the farms of Kheyrabad, Yangabad and Qasem Abad of Jarghooyeh County of Isfahan and their belongings to serve the Muslim pilgrims in 1749. She was very active in holding religious ceremonies.

Works

He has authored several books and treatises, including the following:

 Al-Votaireh (About Al-Wutayra Prayer): In this treatise, he proves that sitting in Al-Wutayra prayer is better than standing. The copy is available in collection number 474 in the Mar'ashi Najafi Library in Qom, 1710
 Al-Takbirat al-Sab'e (The seven Takbirs), 1710
 Roat al-Helal Qabl az Zoval (Seeing the crescent before the demise): Copy No. 1866 is available in the Central Library of University of Tehran, 1710
 Sharh Al-Fieh (Explanation of the book "Al-Fieh" by Muhammad Jamaluddin al-Makki al-Amili): A copy of it in Persian dated 1715 is available in the Central Library of Astan Quds Razavi with number 9936, 1715
 Resaleh dar Ma'ad (Treatise on the Resurrection at the request of Shah Sultan Hussein Safavid): It includes the explanation of the interpretation of the last verses of Surah Az-Zumar in three chapters.
 Nowruznameh (Treatise of Nowruz at the request of Shah Sultan Hussein Safavid): It includes: Introduction, three chapters and a conclusion, and it contains a complete description of the various prayers and foods recommended for Nowruz, 1817
 Resaleh dar Taeyine Rouze Eyde Nowruz (Treatise on determining the day of Nowruz)

He also wrote and compiled some of the religious and scientific books of his time in a beautiful calligraphy method called Naskh, including a copy of the book "Reality of Certainty" by Mohammad-Baqer Majlesi which is available with No. 1942 in the Mar'ashi Najafi Library.

Positions and events
 Mullah Mohammad Jafar Sabzevari was appointed as the Salah al jama'ah 's Imamate of Hakim Mosque and after the death of Mullah Mohammad Saleh Ibn Reza Qoli in 1685 he was appointed as the Imamate of the new Abbasi Grand Mosque (Shah Mosque).
 Mullah Mohammad Jafar and his brother Mullah Mohammad Hadi were among the scholars who, at the invitation of Shah Sultan Hussein Safavid, participated in a scientific assembly held on 5 September 1710 to determine the birthday of Ali ibn Abi Talib. These two brothers expressed their opinion based on the sources and documents they had. At the end of the assembly, the opinion of most scholars and scientists was the 13th of Rajab, and the Shah declared this day as the official birthday of Ali ibn Abi Talib and Eid.
 Mullah Mohammad Jafar and his brother Mullah Mohammad Hadi also attended at the inauguration ceremony of Chahar Bagh school on 4 September 1710, which is one of the most glorious gatherings and meetings in the Safavid government and by the order of Shah Sultan Hussein Safavid and the invitation of the rulers, the lords, ulama, teachers and all the elders of the country were held.

His masters
During his studies, Mullah Mohammad Jafar Sabzevari has benefited from famous masters, including:

 Mohammad Bagher Sabzevari (his father)
 Mohaghegh Khansari
 Mohammad-Baqer Majlesi
 Mirza Rafi'a Naeeni
 Mir Seyyed Esmaeel Khatoon Abadi

His disciples
Mullah Mohammad Jafar Sabzevari also taught outstanding disciples, including:

 Mohammad Ja'far ibn Mohammad Shafi'ee Naeeni: He was one of the scholars of the twelfth century AH. He was apparently one of the students of Mullah Mohammad Jafar Sabzevari. He wrote in handwriting the books "Al-Votaireh", "Roat al-Helal Qabl az Zoval" and "Al-Takbirat al-Sab'e" authored by Mullah Mohammad Jafar Sabzevari in September 1710, which is available in the Mar'ashi Najafi Library with number 478.

In the eyes of others
Hazin Lahiji says about him in his history and travelogue book: Mullah Mohammad Jafar Sabzevari was a genius, who was a famous follower and ascetic.

Demise

Mullah Mohammad Jafar Sabzevari fell ill while Isfahan was under siege by the Afghans and the people living in the city were suffering from high prices and famine. He died on October 20, 1722 and because it was not possible to transport his body to Takht-e Foulad or Mashhad (his father's tomb), his body was taken to Hakim Mosque, which was along the alley of his house, and buried in the southern part of the mosque, known as "Barf Andaz". His mausoleum was out of reach of the public for years, even several centuries, until in recent years, with the construction of Hakim Street, this tomb and mausoleum were located next to the street. This area has been renovated and has become a place of pilgrimage.

Further reading
 The book of "Seeing the Crescent from the Perspective of Scholars": The disagreement of Islamic authorities and countries in proving the sighting of the crescent moon of Ramadan and Shawwal has raised questions and issues that have caused problems for fasting Muslims in performing their religious duties and holding important Islamic ceremonies. The book "Seeing the Crescent from the Perspective of Scholars" (2005, Boostane Ketab, Islamic Sciences and Culture Academy) by Reza Mokhtari and Mohsen Sadeghi, deals with this issue and in the first volume, the second part, thirty independent treatises on seeing the crescent, from more than ten centuries  has been corrected and inserted, the first of which is from the author Al-Shaykh Al-Mufid (948–1022) and the last of them is from the author Mahmoud Hashemi Shahroudi. The treatise Roat al-Helal Qabl az Zoval by Mohammad Jafar Sabzevari (d. 1722) is the ninth treatise included in this book. In the third part, it includes the views of Shiite jurists in detail from the fourth century AH until now. The book of "Seeing the Crescent from the Perspective of Scholars" was selected as the book of the year of the seminary in Iran in 2006.

 Nowruz treatises: Shiite religion was of special importance in the life of Safavid Iranians. Therefore, it is very important to study the approach of religious texts of this period to Nowruz, as the largest national celebration remaining from ancient Iran. In Safavid times, religious debates about Nowruz led to the writing of several treatises entitled "Nowruzieh". In the following research, several "Nowruzieh" are introduced, including the treatise of Mullah Mohammad Jafar Sabzevari and the time course of writing, linguistic and literary features, and the content structure of these treatises are studied: Zarshenas, Zahra / Jafari, Mohsen, Institute for Humanities and Cultural Studies, Nowruz and Nowruzieh writing in the Safavid era, the third year, second issue of 2012, pp. 65–88. This article was the selected article in the history field at the 13th ceremony of honouring the supporters of manuscripts, which was held on November 19, 2013 by the National Library of Iran.

 Why were all these Nowruz treatises written in the Safavid Period? The origin of the Islamic calendar is the first of the month Muharram, and the Sunnis celebrate it as the beginning of the new year. But this is not possible for the Shiites, because Muharram is the month of mourning for them and the events of Karbala have taken place in it, and they cannot celebrate it at the beginning. Therefore, in the Safavid period, Nowruz became important and while maintaining the basis for calculating the current calendar, which is the first of Muharram as the beginning of the Hijri year. They wrote several treatises to highlight Nowruz, which was a good time for celebration. The following article deals with this issue, which includes the treatise of Mullah Mohammad Jafar Sabzevari: Jafarian, Rasool, Why Were All These Nowruz Treatises Written in the Safavid Period?, Specialized Library of Islamic and Iranian History,  February 2017.

See also

 Mohammad Ibrahim Kalbasi
 Mirza-ye Qomi
 Zakaria ibn Idris Ash'ari Qomi
 Seyyed Mohammad Hojjat Kooh Kamari
 Ahmad ibn Ishaq Ash'ari Qomi
 Zakaria ibn Adam Ash'ari Qomi
 Agha Hossein Khansari

References

1722 deaths
Shia clerics from Isfahan
17th-century Iranian writers
Iranian Shia scholars of Islam